is a river in Hokkaidō, Japan.

Rivers of Hokkaido
Rivers of Japan